Bianca Maria Visconti (31 March 1425 – 28 October 1468) was Duchess of Milan from 1450 to 1468 by marriage to Francesco I Sforza. She was regent of Marche during the absence of her spouse in 1448. She served as Regent of the Duchy of Milan during the illness of her spouse in 1462, as well as in 1466, between the death of her spouse and until her son, the new Duke, who was absent, was able to return to Milan to assume power.

Biography

Early years
Born near Settimo Pavese, Bianca Maria was the illegitimate daughter of Filippo Maria Visconti, Duke of Milan and last of the Visconti rulers, and Agnese del Maino. Agnese was the daughter of Ambrogio del Maino, a Milanese nobleman and ducal questore. Agnese served as Lady-in-Waiting to Filippo's wife, Beatrice di Tenda. The couple had a second daughter, called Caterina Maria or Lucia Maria, also born in Settimo in 1426, but she died shortly after her birth.

When she was six months old, Bianca Maria and her mother were sent to a castle in Abbiate, where a rich residence had been established for the two of them. The Duke spent much of his time in Abbiategrasso, where he was impressed by Bianca Maria's strong character.

Bianca Maria spent her childhood and adolescence in Abbiategrasso, where she received a humanist education. The Ducal library contained a wide variety of works: Latin classics, narrative texts in Provençal and French, scientific and didactical works, as well as texts in Italian and volgare, mainly by Tuscan authors. Both Bianca and her father were passionate hunters and lovers of horses.

Bethrothal and wedding

In 1430, at the age of five, Bianca Maria was betrothed to the condottiero Francesco I Sforza, a man twenty-four years older than she. In that year the condotta (contract) between Milan and Sforza came to an end, and the betrothal was a move to keep the powerful general tied with Milan. It has also been suggested that Visconti enticed Sforza with the promise of appointing him as legitimate heir to the duchy. Sforza probably also accepted because of the rich dowry, which included territories in the areas of Cremona, Castellazzo di Bollate and Bosco Frugarolo. The contract was signed on 23 February 1432 in the castle of Porta Giovia, the Visconti residence in Milan. Bianca Maria's official spokesperson was her godfather, Andrea Visconti, general of the Humiliates order. The presence of Bianca Maria and her mother at the ceremony is not certain; according to some sources, she visited Milan for the first time when she was already of marrying age.

In the following years, the suspicious Filippo Maria tried twice to dissolve the betrothal with the ambitious Sforza: in 1434, after the latter had sided with Pope Eugene IV, who sent him to fight Milan, Carlo Gonzaga, the son of the Marquis of Mantua, was contacted. The later project of betrothing Bianca Maria with Leonello d'Este, marquis of Ferrara, Modena and Reggio, was only a political move to pressure Sforza to leave the alliance formed by the Republic of Venice against Milan. Bianca Maria's trip to Ferrara at that time (September 1440) was also her first confirmed trip outside Abbiategrasso. The attempt to force Sforza to change alliances was fruitless, and Bianca Maria returned to her castle in April 1441.

In the same year Niccolò Piccinino, captain of the Milanese troops, created difficulties for Francesco; he asked Visconti for lordship of Piacenza in return for his capture of Sforza. Visconti then moved toward reconciling with Sforza, suspending hostilities and sending him peace proposals, together with the proxy for the marriage with Bianca Maria.

On 24 October 1441 Francesco Sforza and Bianca Maria Visconti were wed in the Abbey of San Sigismondo in Cremona, preferring that city's Cathedral for security reasons. In the typical Italian Renaissance manner, feasts lasted for several days and included a sumptuous banquet, tournaments, a palio, allegorical carts and a huge cake reproduction of the Torrazzo, the city's main tower. It is probable that this cake is the origin of the torrone.

Marriage
On 7 November 1441, Filippo Maria issued a decree reducing the rights of his vassals, Francesco included. The latter preferred to establish himself in the safer territory of Venetia, in the hamlet of Sanguinetto. In the same years Francesco and Bianca Maria were invited to Venice by the doge of Venice, Francesco Foscari. Shortly thereafter, news that Piccinino was menacing Sforza's possessions in the Marche reached the city. Bianca Maria then accompanied her husband to Rimini, where they were guests of Sigismondo Pandolfo Malatesta, in Gradara and then in Jesi. Here she remained in the castle while Francesco led the military operations against Piccinino.  In 1442 Bianca Maria (then 17 years old) was named regent of the Marche. This choice may seem surprising, but numerous contemporary chronicles state that Bianca Maria had repeatedly proven her skills in administration and diplomacy. As for the ducal couple's personal relationship, if it is certain that Francesco had strong feelings towards Bianca Maria, it is also true that he was frequently unfaithful to her. Bianca Maria usually reacted with nonchalance. On one occasion, however, in 1443, one of her husband's mistresses disappeared and was killed in dubious circumstances.

In 1442 Francesco was excommunicated. Four years later, ill and declining, Filippo Maria Visconti approached Francesco for a reconciliation.  The latter, however, remained distrustful, and, despite Bianca Maria's pleading, preferred to concentrate on the defense of his territories, menaced by Papal troops. In 1447 Sforza, feeling more confident, accepted the position of lieutenant of the Duchy of Milan, but Visconti, jealous and suspicious after the popularity of Sforza in Milan, soon changed his mind. At the same time the new Pope, Nicholas V, demanded the restitution of Jesi. It was a very difficult time for Francesco and Bianca Maria.

Francesco Sforza gave back to the pope the town of Jesi in exchange for 35,000 florins, and moved towards Milan along with his wife. News of the death of Filippo Maria Visconti, who died in the night between 13 and 14 August 1447, reached Francesco in Cotignola. Bianca Maria was very angry when she heard about the depredations suffered by the Visconti properties in Milan after Filippo's death. Bianca Maria and Francesco were marching toward Milan, with 4,000 knights and 2,000 infantry, when the new-born Ambrosian Republic, under the menace of a Venetian invasion, offered Francesco the title of Captain General. Bianca Maria favored refusing, but Francesco accepted, starting three years in which he strove to reconquer the cities that had declared independence from the Duchy after Filippo Visconti's death.

In May 1448, when Sforza was in Pavia, the Venetians attacked Cremona. According to the chronicles, Bianca Maria donned a suit of parade armor and, along with some troops and the populace, hurried to defend wards the city. She fought in the battle that ensued for the whole day. This episode gained her fame as a "warrior woman".

After the Venetian danger had been repulsed, Bianca Maria settled in the Visconti Castle of Pavia, together with a large court. Her good relationships with her Visconti relatives gained popular support, as well as loans and funds, for the fragile new state created by her husband. On 24 February 1450, a revolt broke out in Milan. The Venetian ambassador was killed, as the Venetian Republic was deemed responsible for the famine that had struck Milan. A meeting of nobles and citizens recognized Francesco as lord.

Duchess of Milan
The date of the entrance of the new duke and duchess in Milan is disputed: 22 March or 25 March. Francesco and Bianca Maria refused the triumphal wagon (they called it superstizione da re, "kings' superstition"), instead reaching the Duomo riding on a couple of horses. It was the first time that a duke's title had been awarded by the citizens of the city.

During the first years of their reign, Bianca collaborated with her husband in recovering her father's assets and restoring the Ducal Palace. Francesco was again entangled in a war against Venice. Remaining alone in Milan, Bianca Maria devoted herself to the administration of the Duchy, as attested by the correspondence with her husband, which gives precious insights on the education of their children, state affairs, the financial difficulties, and details of her daily life.  The letters also show the assertive character of Bianca Maria, who did not hesitate to express her opinions even when they differed from her husband's.  The letters include also accusations of his extramarital adventures.

In 1453 in Pavia, Bianca Maria hosted René I of Naples, who was asked to go to Cremona with his army to fight alongside Sforza. She later showed him the construction site of the large new Castello Sforzesco in Milan.

After the Peace of Lodi in 1454, Bianca Maria devoted herself not only to diplomacy and the restoration and embellishment of the several Ducal residences, but also to public works. The ducal couple had a large hospital built in Milan, the Ospedale Maggiore, and often Bianca Maria offered direct help to numerous poor women. In 1459 Pope Pius II summoned a council in Mantua to prepare a crusade against the Ottoman Turks. Bianca Maria offered 300 knights, and Francesco was proposed as military leader of the expedition. The crusade never materialized, but Francesco and Bianca Maria's support of the papacy gained them bulls of indulgence for the Duomo and the Ospedale Maggiore of Milan.

In 1462 Francesco Sforza, who suffered from gout and dropsy, fell ill. During his absence from the government, Bianca Maria's political and administrative capabilities prevented the state from crumbling after some rebellions spurred by Venice. She acted effectively as co-regent of the Duchy. Bianca Maria also promoted a marriage between Jacopo Piccinino, the son of Niccolò, and Drusiana, Francesco's illegitimate daughter.

Dowager Duchess
The main problems for Bianca Maria in this period came from their eldest son, Galeazzo Maria, whose unstable and treacherous character created numerous troubles for her. On 13 December 1465, her mother, Agnese del Maino, died. Shortly afterward, on 8 March 1466, Duke Francesco Sforza died also. Bianca Maria quickly took the reins of the duchy as regent and called back Galeazzo Maria, who was fighting alongside the king of France, to succeed as duke. The latter's behavior was initially one of gratitude and deference towards his mother, but soon greed and ruthlessness led him to act independently against Bianca Maria's advice. As time passed, the Duke relegated his mother to an increasingly secondary role and in the end forced her to leave Milan. She then moved to Cremona, her dower city. According to some sources, she was thinking of giving the control of the city to Venice, and she had frequent contacts with Ferdinand I of Naples, who was aiming to overthrow Galeazzo.

Against the advice of all her counsellors, Bianca Maria decided to take part in Galeazzo's marriage on 9 May 1468. At the end of the feasts she accompanied her daughter Ippolita to Serravalle,  whence she set off to Cremona. However, when midway, in Melegnano, she fell ill. A high fever obliged her to stay in bed until August, but she kept up an intense correspondence. At the beginning of October, her condition worsened further. She died on 28 October of that year, after having recommended her younger children, Elisabetta and Ottaviano, to their brother Galeazzo. She was buried in the Duomo of Milan, next to her husband. The funeral oration, commissioned by Galeazzo, was written by the humanist Francesco Filelfo.

Her death raised suspicions; Galeazzo Maria Sforza was accused by various men, including Bartolomeo Colleoni, of having poisoned her. It is certain that during her illness, there were in Melegnano certain men close to Galeazzo, some of whom were later involved in other cases of poisoning. According to Bernardino Corio, Bianca "died of natural ungratefulness more than poison".

Issue
Bianca Maria and Francesco Sforza had:
 Galeazzo Maria (24 January 1444 — 26 December 1476), Duke of Milan from 1466 to 1476.
 Ippolita Maria (18 April 1446 — 20 August 1484), wife of Alfonso II of Naples
  (12 December 1449 — 1492), Count of Corsica.
  (18 August 1451 — 29 July 1479), Duke of Bari from 1464 to 1479.
 Ludovico Maria (3 August 1452 — 27 May 1508), Duke of Bari from 1479 to 1494 and Duke of Milan from 1494 to 1499.
 Francesco Galeazzo Maria (5 August 1453/54 — died young).
 Ascanio Maria (3 March 1455 — 28 May 1505), Abbot of Chiaravalle, Bishop of Pavia, Cremona, Pesaro, and Novara and Cardinal.
  (10 June 1456 — 1473), second wife of Guglielmo VIII Paleologo, Margrave of Montferrat. She had two daughters by her husband: Giovanna, married to Ludovico II, Marquess of Saluzzo, and Blanche of Montferrat.
  (30 April 1458 — 1477), who drowned while escaping arrest.

Curiosity
There is a tradition that the "Visconti di Modrone" Tarot cards, one of the oldest decks in existence, was commissioned by her father in 1441 as a wedding present to Bianca Maria and Francesco. On account of this, she is sometimes referred to as "Lady Tarot".

In literature

References

Sources

Daniela Pizzigalli, La signora di Milano: Vita e passioni di Bianca Maria Visconti, Rizzoli 2000
 Caterina Santoro, Gli Sforza. La casata nobiliare che resse il Ducato di Milano dal 1450 al 1535, Lampi di Stampa 1999
Lila Jahn, Bianca Maria duchessa di Milano, Milano, Garzanti, 1941
 Winifred Terni de Gregory, Bianca Maria Visconti duchessa di Milano, Bergamo, 1940

1425 births
1468 deaths
Bianca Maria
Duchesses of Milan
People from the Province of Pavia
15th-century Italian women
15th-century women rulers
Bianca Maria Visconti
15th-century Italian nobility
Burials at Milan Cathedral
Renaissance women
Women in war in Italy
Women in 15th-century warfare